River, Cross My Heart is a debut novel by Breena Clarke. It was chosen in October 1999 as an Oprah Book Club selection: "This highly accomplished first novel resonates with ideas, impassioned lyricism, and poignant historical detail as it captures an essential part of the African-American experience in our century."

Plot introduction
After the Potomac River claims the death by drowning of eight-year-old Clara Bynum, her family leave the rural world of North Carolina in search of a better life among friends and relatives in Georgetown, Washington, DC. They seek to come to terms with their loss.

References

1999 novels
Novels set in North Carolina
Little, Brown and Company books
Novels set in Washington, D.C.
Georgetown (Washington, D.C.)
African-American novels
1999 debut novels